The following page lists all active and former power stations in Victoria, Australia.

Loy Yang is the largest Power Station by capacity in Victoria.

Currently active

Coal fired 
These fossil fuel power stations burn coal to generate some or all of the electricity they produce.

 Yallourn scheduled for closure in 2028.
 Loy Yang B scheduled for closure in 2046.
 Loy Yang A scheduled for closure in 2035.

Gas turbine 
These gas turbine power stations use gas combustion to generate some or all of the electricity they produce.

Gas (thermal) 
These power stations use gas combustion to power steam turbines that generate some or all of the electricity they produce.

Gas (reciprocating) 
These power stations use gas combustion in reciprocating engines to generate some or all of the electricity they produce.

Hydroelectric 
These hydroelectric power stations use the flow of water to generate some or all of the electricity they produce.

Solar

Wind farms

Biomass combustion 
These power stations burn biomass (biofuel) to generate some or all of the electricity they produce.

Decommissioned power stations

See also 

 List of power stations in Australia
 List of coal power stations
 List of largest power stations in the world

Notes 
 R. Arklay and I. Sayer - 'Geelong's Electric Supply' - September 1970

References

External links 
 NEMMCO List of Generators (zip)
 List of Green Power approved generators (pdf)
 Australian Business Council for Sustainable Energy
 BCSE Renewable Energy Power Plant Register 2006 (pdf)
 Sustainability Victoria renewable energy
 Proposed power stations in Victoria
Map of Power Station Locations in the NEM

 
Victoria, active
Victoria (Australia)-related lists
Lists of buildings and structures in Victoria (Australia)